France Universités, formerly Conférence des Présidents d'Université (CPU) is an organization of university presidents in France.

Overview
The Conférence des Présidents d'Université was created in 1971. Its meetings are not open to the public. Its current president is José Manuel Tunon de Lara, former President of Université of Bordeaux.

References

Think tanks based in France